Bridget Bishop ( 1632 – 10 June 1692) was the first person executed for witchcraft during the Salem witch trials in 1692. Nineteen were hanged, and one, Giles Corey, was pressed to death. Altogether, about 200 people were tried.

Family life 
Bridget's maiden name was Magnus. She, her sister Mercy, her father John, and her mother Rebecca adopted the last name Playfer, Bridget's paternal grandmother's maiden name. She was married three or possibly four times.

She married her first husband, Captain Samuel Wesselby on 13 April 1660, at St. Mary-in-the-Marsh, Norwich, Norfolk, England. She had two sons and one daughter from her first marriage: John, Benjamin and Mary. Her first husband died in 1666.

Her second marriage, on 26 July 1666, was to Thomas Oliver, a widower and prominent businessman. She had another daughter from her marriage to Thomas Oliver, Chrestian Oliver (sometimes spelled Christian), born 8 May 1667. She was earlier accused of bewitching Thomas Oliver to death, but was acquitted for lack of evidence.

Her third marriage c. 1687 was to Edward Bishop, a prosperous sawyer, whose family lived in Beverly. Her third husband, Edward Bishop, is also one of the founders of the First Church of Beverly. He was 44 at the time of the trials.

Bridget ran two taverns alongside Edward. Bridget Bishop was always seen by friends, family, and guests wearing exotic clothes and bright colors, both far from the standard clothes associated with the devil.

Nature of allegations 
Bridget Bishop was examined due to her accusation of suspicion of "sundry acts of witchcraft". Bishop was accused of bewitching five young women, Abigail Williams, Ann Putnam, Jr., Mercy Lewis, Mary Walcott, and Elizabeth Hubbard, on the date of her examination by the authorities, 19 April 1692.

Bishop's trial lasted eight days, officially starting the Salem Witchcraft Trials. A record was given of her trial by Cotton Mather in "Wonders of the Invisible World." In his book, Mather recorded that several people testified against Bishop, stating that the shape of Bishop would pinch, choke or bite them. The shape also threatened to drown one victim if she did not write her name in a certain book. According to Mather, during the trial, any time Bishop would look upon one of her accusers, they would be immediately struck down and only her touch would revive them. 

More allegations were made during the trial including that of a woman saying that the apparition of Bishop tore her coat, and upon further examination her coat was found to be torn in the exact spot. Mather mentions that the truth of these many accusations carried too much suspicion, however. 

Ezekiel Cheevers and John Putnam made the complaint against Bridget Bishop. Bishop was charged for committing witchcraft upon five women, Ann Putnam, Mercy Lewis, Abigail Williams, Mary Walcot, and Elis Hubert. These women claimed Bridget Bishop to be the witch who hurt them. Ann Putnam stated that Bishop called the devil her God, while other people such as Richard Coman accused Bishop of taking hold of their throats and ripping Coman and his wife out of bed. Other girls accused her of harming them with just a quick glance. Even Bishop's own husband claimed she praised the devil. 

William Stacy, a middle aged man in Salem Town, testified that Bishop had previously made statements to him that other people in the town considered her to be a witch. He confronted her with the allegation that she was using witchcraft to torment him, which she denied. Another local man, Samuel Shattuck, accused Bishop of bewitching his child and also of striking his son with a spade. 

He also testified that Bishop asked him to dye lace, which apparently was too small to be used on anything but a poppet, a doll used in spell-casting. John and William Bly, father and son, testified about finding poppets in Bishop's house and also about their cat that appeared to be bewitched, or poisoned, after a dispute with Bishop. Other victims of Bishop, as recorded by Mather, include Deliverance Hobbs, John Cook, Samuel Gray, and John Louder.

During her sentencing, a jury of women found a third nipple upon Bishop (then considered a sure sign of witchcraft), yet upon a second examination the nipple was not found. In the end Mather states that the greatest thing that condemned Bishop was the gross amount of lying she committed in court. According to Mather, "there was little occasion to prove the witchcraft, it being evident and notorious to all beholders." 

Bishop was sentenced to death and hanged. She was recorded to be the first woman to die from hanging in the colony.

Traditional historical interpretation

Recent historical interpretation 
One interpretation of the historical record suggests that she was a resident of Salem Town and thus not the tavern owner. Perhaps she did not know her accusers. This would be supported in her deposition in Salem Village before the authorities stating, "I never saw these persons before, nor I never was in this place before." The indictments against her clearly note that she was from "Salem" which meant Salem Town, as other indictments against residents of Salem Village specified their locations as such.
She was often confused with Sarah Bishop, one of the other accused during the Salem trial. While men were still being accused of witchcraft, it was mostly women being indicted during this time period. They were often quickly accused and sentenced to death within days. Bridget Bishop had already been accused and deemed innocent a whole decade following up to the witchcraft hysteria.

References

Further reading 

The Salem Witchcraft Papers on Bridget Bishop

1630s births
1692 deaths
People of the Salem witch trials
American people executed for witchcraft
People executed by the Province of Massachusetts Bay
Executed English women
People executed by the Thirteen Colonies by hanging
People executed by Massachusetts by hanging
Executed English people
17th-century executions of American people
People executed by the Massachusetts Bay Colony
Kingdom of England emigrants to Massachusetts Bay Colony
Lynching deaths